La línea invisible is a 2020 Spanish historical drama television miniseries directed by Mariano Barroso, and written by Michel Gaztambide and Alejandro Hernández with the collaboration of Barroso, based on an idea by Abel García Roure. It premiered in six parts on April 8, 2020 on Movistar+. The series tells the origin story of the first killing by Basque separatist organization ETA.

Cast
 Àlex Monner as Txabi Etxebarrieta
 Antonio de la Torre as Melitón Manzanas 
 Anna Castillo as Txiki 
 Enric Auquer as 
 Patrick Criado as Txema
 Joan Amargós as Maxi 
 Emilio Palacios as Peru 
  as Teresa
 Amaia Sagasti as Julia
 Xóan Fórneas as José Antonio Pardines
 Alba Loureiro

with the special collaboration of
 Asier Etxeandia as El inglés
 Patricia López Arnaiz as Clara 
  as madre de Txabi 
 Pablo Derqui as Chamorro

Episodes

Awards and nominations

References

External links
 
 

2020s Spanish drama television series
2020 Spanish television series debuts
2020 Spanish television series endings
Spanish-language television shows
Television series about the history of Spain
Television series based on actual events
Television series set in the 1960s
Television shows set in Biscay
Movistar+ network series
Spanish television series about terrorism
ETA (separatist group)